Alexandrovka is a rural locality (a village) in Posyolok Anopino, Gus-Khrustalny District, Vladimir Oblast, Russia. The population was 73 as of 2010. There are 4 streets.

Geography 
The village is located 4 km south-west from Anopino, 8 km north from Gus-Khrustalny.

References 

Rural localities in Gus-Khrustalny District
Sudogodsky Uyezd